John Vivian (c.1729–1771) was the Regius Professor of Modern History at Oxford between 1768 and 1771. He was the son of William Vivian of Padstow, Cornwall, and became a Fellow of Balliol College, Oxford in 1750.

Notes

Fellows of Balliol College, Oxford
British historians
1771 deaths
18th-century English people
People from Padstow
Year of birth unknown
Regius Professors of History (University of Oxford)
Year of birth uncertain